WD-40 is an American brand and the trademark of a penetrating oil manufactured by the WD-40 Company based in San Diego, California. The formula for WD-40 was invented for the Rocket Chemical Company as early as 1953 before it evolved into the WD-40 Company. WD-40 became available as a commercial product in 1961. It acts as a lubricant, rust preventive, penetrant and moisture displacer. There are specialized products that perform better than WD-40 in each of these uses, but WD-40's flexibility has given it fame as a jack of all trades.  WD-40 stands for Water Displacement, 40th formula. 

It is a successful product to this day, with steady growth in net income from $27 million in 2008 to $70.2 million in 2021. In 2014, it was inducted into the International Air & Space Hall of Fame at the San Diego Air & Space Museum.

History 
Sources credit different people with inventing WD-40 formula in 1953 as part of the Rocket Chemical Company (later renamed to WD-40 Company), in San Diego, California; the formula was kept as a trade secret and was never patented.

According to Iris Engstrand, a historian of San Diego and California history at the University of San Diego, Iver Norman Lawson invented the formula, while the WD-40 company website and other books and newspapers credit Norman B. Larsen. According to Engstrand, "(Iver Norman) Lawson was acknowledged at the time, but his name later became confused with company president Norman B. Larsen." "WD-40" is abbreviated from the term "Water Displacement, 40th formula", suggesting it was the result of the 40th attempt to create the product. The spray, composed of various hydrocarbons, was originally designed to be used by Convair to protect the outer skin of the Atlas missile from rust and corrosion. This outer skin also functioned as the outer wall of the missile's paper-thin fuel balloon tanks, which were so fragile that, when empty, they had to be kept inflated with nitrogen to prevent them from collapsing. WD-40 was later found to have many household uses and was made available to consumers in San Diego in 1958.

In Engstrand's account, it was Iver Norman Lawson who came up with the water-displacing mixture after working at home and turned it over to the Rocket Chemical Company for the sum of $500. It was Norman Larsen, president of the company, who had the idea of packaging it in aerosol cans and marketed it in this way.

It was written up as a new consumer product in 1961. By 1965 it was being used by airlines including Delta and United; United, for example, was using it on fixed and movable joints of their DC-8 and Boeing 720s in maintenance and overhaul. At that time, airlines were using a variant called WD-60 to clean turbines, removing light rust from control lines, and when handling or storing metal parts. By 1969 WD-40 was being marketed to farmers and mechanics in England. In 1973, WD-40 Company, Inc., went public with its first stock offering.

Formulation
WD-40's formula is a trade secret and has not changed over the years. The original copy of the formula was moved to a secure bank vault in San Diego in 2018.

To avoid disclosing its composition, the product was not patented in 1953, and the window of opportunity for patenting it has long since closed.

WD-40's main ingredients as supplied in aerosol cans, according to the US Material Safety Data Sheet information, and with the CAS numbers interpreted:
 45–50% low vapor pressure aliphatic hydrocarbon (isoparaffin)
 <35% petroleum base oil (non-hazardous heavy paraffins)
 <25% aliphatic hydrocarbons (same CAS number as the first item, but flammable)
 2–3% carbon dioxide (propellant)

The European formulation is stated according to the REACH regulations:
 60–80% hydrocarbons C9-C11 n-alkanes, iso-alkanes, cyclics <2% aromatics
 1–5% carbon dioxide

The Australian formulation is stated:
 50–60% naphtha (petroleum), hydrotreated heavy
 <25% petroleum base oils
 <10% naphtha (petroleum), hydrodesulfurized heavy (contains: 1,2,4-trimethyl benzene, 1,3,5-trimethyl benzene, xylene, mixed isomers)
 2–4% carbon dioxide

In 2009, Wired published an article with the results of gas chromatography and mass spectrometry tests on WD-40, showing that the principal components were C9 to C14 alkanes and mineral oil.

References

External links

 
 WD-40 Safety Data Sheet
 WD-40 uses, by Snopes.com

Products introduced in 1953
American brands
American inventions
Brand name materials
Petroleum based lubricants
Trade secrets